Tanna sayurie is an insect, a species of cicada of the genus Tanna. It was first found at Funkiko near Mount Arisan, Taiwan.

Notes

References 
 
 

Tanna (genus)
Insects of Taiwan
Insects described in 1926